Pierre Hugard (1726–1761) was a French composer. He is best known for his Missa Redde mihi laetitiam.

References
Jean-Paul C. Montagnier, The Polyphonic Mass in France, 1600–1780: The Evidence of the Printed Choirbooks, Cambridge: Cambridge University Press, 2017.

French Classical-period composers
1726 births
1761 deaths
18th-century classical composers
French male classical composers
18th-century French composers
18th-century French male musicians